Jupp is a German masculine given name, short for Joseph. Notable people with the name include:

 Jupp Derwall (1927–2007), German footballer and coach
 Jupp Heynckes (born 1945), German football coach
 Jupp Kapellmann (born 1949), German footballer

German masculine given names